Joi Barua is an Indian singer and music composer. Born in Digboi, Assam, he started his career by singing advertising jingles and later did playback singing for Hindi, Assamese and Telugu films. He is also the lead vocalist of the band Joi. Barua has a mixed musical style incorporating elements of rock, soul, jazz, folk and world music.

Early life
Joi was born in Digboi, Assam, the younger of the two children to Ranjana Barua and Rohini Dhar Barua. His father gave him a violin when he was four years old and that triggered his lifelong passion for music. His family moved to Jorhat when he was in junior school. When he was seven years old, his sister pushed him to join a singing competition and taught him the popular Cliff Richard song 'Bachelor Boy'. Even though ignorant about singing at that age, he won the competition. It was a defining moment. His school principal, Sister Mabilia, understood his passion for music and since then she never missed an opportunity to encourage him into singing and taking part in stage acts. Her favourite was the Boney M song 'El Lute' -about a man wrongly imprisoned for a crime he did not commit- which he would often sing to her. He considers her as his first guru in life and a constant source of inspiration. At home, he and his cousin Piku would sing songs of The Beatles, The Eagles, Simon and Garfunkel, U2, etc. He passed out his high school from St. Anthony's College, Shillong, and later attended Gauhati Commerce College for graduation.

His personal inspirations include his father, who always encouraged him to take music out of classrooms into the hearts of people, and his ex-principal Sister Mabilia who guided his passion for music. His musical influences have been varied. It includes Sting, The Beatles, The Eagles, Iron Maiden, The Police, Ozzy Osbourne, Joe Satriani, Eric Clapton, U2, etc. Classical Composers like Beethoven, Rossini, Vivaldi and Mozart, and Indians musicians like L. Subramaniam, A.R. Rahman, Salil Chowdhury, Ilaiyaraaja, Bhupen Hazarika and Jayanta Hazarika also influenced him a lot.

Career
Barua started his career by singing jingles for several advertising campaigns including Fiat Linea, Vodafone, Reliance, LG, Hero Honda, Nescafe, Club Mahindra, Yatra.com etc. Before starting playback singing, he worked as background singers for several Bollywood films in the early 2000s. His notable playback singing for Hindi films include Dev.D, Udaan, Luv Ka The End, Mujhse Fraaandship Karoge, Zindagi Na Milegi Dobara. In 2010, he recorded two songs for Telugu film Kalavar King.

Albums and singles 
Barua, along with his band mates of Joi, launched the album titled Joi: Looking out of the Window on 21 December 2010. The album contains 8 tracks and all of them features vocals of Barua. The songs are a blend of rock, soul, folk and worldbeat. The band also released the first music video filmed on Aikon Baaikon, a track from the album. Apart from Barua, the band members are Pawan Rasaily (lead guitar), Ibson Lal Baruah (rhythm guitar), Manas Chowdhary (bass guitar) and Partho Goswami (drums).

In 2011, he sang the Assamese song "Khiriki" for Hengool Theatre. In June 2013, Joi and his band released an Assamese single, Pitol Soku from the documentary Riders of the Mist. The documentary features the bareback jockeys of Jorhat and Sivasagar districts of the Assam and the song pays an homage to them. A blend of Rock and Worldbeat, the song and its promotional video was unveiled by John Abraham and Vishal Dadlani.

In 2014, he collaborated with Shruti Haasan and composed an Assamese-Tamil fusion song titled Prithibi Ghure, and performed together in an INKtalks live event. The Tamil lyrics was penned by Kamal Haasan, while the Assamese lyrics were written by Ibson Lal Baruah.

Joi released a number of singles during 2016 and 2017, under the project name 'Pride'. These songs with their videos portrays stories from Assam. While 'Rabha' narrated an incident of the legendary Bishnu Rabha, collaborated with American saxophonist George Brooks, 'Na Jujor Ronuwa''' stressed on the lesser-known, but the largest tribe within Assam, the Koch-Rajbongshi's. 

 Movies and documentaries 
In 2015, Barua composed the track Dusokute for the film Margarita With A Straw. In the same year, Joi composed the songs & scored background music for a movie produced by John Abraham through John Abraham Entertainment Private Limited. The movie, titled 'Banana' was Directed by Sajid Ali.

In 2016, Joi released another single titled "Riders of the Mist" from the documentary by the same name.   This song was launched first in the music channel VH1 and was then circulated online. Joi composed the background score for a short film Playing Priya and sang its title track with Jonita Gandhi. Titled "Meetha Zeher", the song comes in the end credits of the movie.

In 2018, Joi co-composed the music for the movie Laila Majnu along with Niladri Kumar. Written by Imtiaz Ali and Sajid Ali, the movie was directed by Sajid Ali. 

Joi composed a song titled 'Subeh Dekh Li' for the Indian-American production The Illegal in 2019. Ankit Tiwari rendered his voice to the song.

 International collaborations 
Joi is the co-composer of the original songs for the Album 'Lim Fantasy of Companionship for Piano and Orchestra'. Conceptualized on an original story by Dr. Susan Lim and  Christina Teenz Tan, this is a collaborative venture with musicians across continents. A conversation with Dr. Lim at an INK Talks conference in 2017 at Singapore, where Joi performed and showcased his song 'Rabha' for the first time led to the project. French musicians Manu Martin and Matthieu Eymard, along with Ron Danziger from Australia, co-composed the original songs that form the 21 vignettes of the thirty-three minute album. 

Working towards a future musical told from the intersections of Science & Artificial Life, the music production has been centered around and recorded at Abbey Road Studios, London. London Symphony Orchestra, London Voices, Pianist Tedd Joselson and conductor Arthur Fagen, are the principal collaborators to this album.

Personal life
He lives in Mumbai, India with his wife Nayana Borthakur and their Lhasa Apso, Junuka.

Awards and recognitions
2010 - Best Debut Award (2010) for the album Joi- Looking Out of the Window'' at the Big Music Awards by Big 92.7 FM, Guwahati.

2010 - He was invited as a 'Fellow' at the first INK Conference in 2010, a TED affiliated multidisciplinary conference, and as an INK Speaker in 2011.

2021 

 Hollywood Gold Awards for 'Best Original Song' (New World Order) & 'Best Original Score' (with Manu Martin & Ron Danziger) - under the categories of Sci-fi & Animated Film respectively for the film FANTASY OF COMPANIONSHIP BETWEEN HUMAN AND INANIMATE.
 Chicago Indie Film Awards - 'Best Composer' in the 9th Edition of the Chicago Indie Film Awards for the music video of 'New World Order'
 Cannes World Film Festival (Feb '21) - Best Soundtrack for the film FANTASY OF COMPANIONSHIP BETWEEN HUMAN AND INANIMATE

Discography

References

External links

 www.joibarua.com – Official Website
 A bareback ride with Joi – The Telegraph
 Interview with Joi Barua at IndianMusicMug
 Joi – A Voice spreading Joy at Fried Eye
 Joi: Looking Out of the Window – a Review at Fried Eye
 IndianMusicMug ia celebrating 2012 Rongali/ Bohag Bihu with Joi Barua at IndianMusicMug

Indian male singers
Living people
Year of birth missing (living people)
Musicians from Assam
Singers from Assam
Assamese playback singers
People from Tinsukia district